Elaeus or Elaious or Elaios (Ἐλαῖος) was an emporium or trading place on the coast of Bithynia at the mouth of a river of the same name. Elaeus was 120 stadia west of Cales.

It is located on the north coast of modern Turkey, at the mouth of its name-sake river.

References

Populated places in Bithynia
Former populated places in Turkey
History of Zonguldak Province